This page lists the World Best Year Performances in the year 1982 in the Marathon for both men and women. Australia's Robert de Castella broke the men's world record on December 6, 1981, at the Fukuoka Marathon, clocking a total time of 2:08:18.

Men

Records

1982 World Year Ranking

Women

Records

1982 World Year Ranking

References
digilander.libero

External links
1982 Marathon Ranking by the ARRS

1982
 Marathon